Münsterbrücke (German for "Minster bridge"), may refer to the following structures:

 Münsterbrücke, Hamelin, a bridge across the river Weser in Hamelin, Germany
 Münsterbrücke, Zürich, a bridge across the river Limmat in Zurich, Switzerland